PlayTV was a Brazilian television station operated by Gamecorp. It was inaugurated on June 5, 2006 replacing Rede 21 in partnership with Grupo Bandeirantes de Comunicação. As soon as the contract has ended with Bandeirantes, it became a private channel being transmitted by SKY Brasil, NET and other pay television services in Brazil. Its programming was focused on information about music, movies, anime and games.
In May 2020, the channel was shut down, with the variety-focused channel TV Walter Abrahão replacing it.

History

Satellite transmission
Between March 30 and May 28, 2007, Play TV was present at 1240 MHz horizontal of Star One B4 (Star One C2) (today, this frequency is used by a gospel channel), previously used for the transmission of TV Jockey. Later, the channel also started broadcasting at 4087 MHz horizontal of Brasilsat B3 (Brasilsat B4). Now used to broadcast infomercials, the frequency is still owned by Play TV.

On July 8, Rede 21, returned to the analog system from 15h00min to 00h00min.

End of transmission
On July 7, 2008, Rede 21 returned after the breach of contract between Grupo Bandeirantes de Comunicação and Gamecorp (owned by Oi — former Telemar — and Fábio Luís Lula da Silva).

The partnership should be of ten years, however, Grupo Bandeirantes de Comunicação, not satisfied with the channel, decided not to renew the contract with Play TV creative masterminds, replaced by Rede 21, at 21 UHF of São Paulo. Then, the channel became available only via on-line streaming.

Resumption of transmissions
On November 11, 2008, the channel has become a paid channel, with the channel 86 of SKY Brazil. The channel also announced the broadcast of the channel by the cable TV NET city of Brasília on the date December 1.

On November 11, 2008, the channel became closed, transmitted at channel 86 in SKY Brasil. Also, the channel announced that is going to be transmitted by NET in Brasília by December 1.

Programming
PlayTV divided its programming with music videos, film reviews, gameplay TV programs, TV dramas, reality shows, and anime series.

General programming

Eu Q Mando Twitter - block with music videos selected by Twitter users
Caliente - block with uncensored music videos
Cineplay - program based on film backstages
Combo Fala + Joga - a "mashup" of talk show with video game competitions
GameTV - news about video games
Bunka Pop - Japanese pop culture
Interferência - a selection of music videos of a certain genre
Ponto Pop 10 - news about pop music including a list of 10 music videos
Mok - news about video games and technology
Qu4tro Coisas - pop culture
PlayHit - media about a game along with music someone requested

Anime programming
Bleach (2014–2018)
Darling in the Franxx (2019-2020)
Death Note (2014-2015)
Love Hina (2007-2008)
Monster Rancher (2008)
Naruto: Shippuden (2015–2017)
Ranma ½ (2007-2008)
Re:Zero − Starting Life in Another World (2019-2020)
Saint Seiya (2008)
Samurai Champloo (2007-2008)
Trigun (2007-2008)
Yu-Gi-Oh! Duel Monsters (2015–2018)
Yu Yu Hakusho (2008)

References

External links
 PlayTV 
 

Television networks in Brazil
Television stations in Brazil
Defunct television channels in Brazil
Music television channels
Anime television
Television channels and stations established in 2006
2006 establishments in Brazil
Music organisations based in Brazil
Television channels and stations disestablished in 2020